Christine Electra Williamson (born October 28, 1995) is an American beauty pageant titleholder from Memphis, Tennessee, that has held the titles of Miss Tennessee (Miss America) 2018, Miss Tennessee (Miss Volunteer America) 2018, and America's Ideal Miss 2021. She holds a B.A. in Broadcast Journalism from the University of Mississippi and a Master's in Business Administration and Certification in Data Analytics from the University of Tennessee at Chattanooga. Williamson is a national advocate for Alzheimer's awareness.

Philanthropy 
Williamson is a national advocate for Alzheimer's awareness and serves as a national ambassador for the Alzheimer's Association; as of 2018, she had raised more than $25,000 for the association. During her tenure as Miss Tennessee, she also served as the Tennessee Goodwill Ambassador for Children's Miracle Network Hospitals and as Tennessee Governor Bill Haslam's Official Spokesperson for Character Education traveling over 80,000 miles speaking to 50,000 schoolchildren about Character Education.

Pageant career 
Williamson competed at Miss Tennessee (Miss America) for five years before winning, holding the titles of Miss Memphis 2014, Miss Smoky Mountains 2015, Miss Mountain Empire 2016, Miss Scenic City 2017, and Miss Chattanooga 2018. She was crowned Miss Tennessee (Miss America) in 2018 after winning preliminary awards in swimsuit and talent (she sang "Never Enough" from the Greatest Showman for the talent competition). She represented Tennessee at Miss America 2019 and was named as a finalist for both the Quality of Life Award and Women in Business scholarships. Williamson has received around $50,000 in scholarships from competing in pageants.

Williamson resigned from her position as Miss Tennessee (Miss America) on May 10, 2019, claiming adverse circumstances, "blatant disregard" for her role as a titleholder, and an "ill-conceived" leadership transition after the state organization she was crowned by was terminated in September 2018.  The previous state organization, led by Allison Alderson Demarcus, was de-franchised by the Miss America organization after they, along with other Miss America state organizations, expressed displeasure with the Miss America organization's leadership and their treatment of titleholders. Demarcus' organization founded a new pageant, Miss Volunteer America, of which Williamson was the inaugural titleholder as the first Miss Tennessee Volunteer.

Williamson competed in Miss Tennessee USA 2021 and placed 2nd runner-up. Later that year, she was crowned the inaugural America's Ideal Miss.

References

Living people
1995 births